Panic Movement (Mouvement panique) was an art collective formed by Fernando Arrabal, Alejandro Jodorowsky, and Roland Topor in Paris in 1962. Inspired by and named after the god Pan, and influenced by Luis Buñuel and Antonin Artaud's Theatre of Cruelty, the group concentrated on chaotic and surreal performance art, as a response to surrealism becoming mainstream.

The movement's violent theatrical events were designed to be shocking, and to release destructive energies in search of peace and beauty. One four-hour performance known as Sacramental Melodrama was staged in May 1965 at the Paris Festival of Free Expression. The "happening" starred Jodorowsky dressed in motorcyclist leather and featured him slitting the throats of two geese, taping two snakes to his chest and having himself stripped and whipped. Other scenes included "naked women covered in honey, a crucified chicken, the staged murder of a rabbi, a giant vagina, the throwing of live turtles into the audience, and canned apricots."

Arrabal and Jodorowsky later started to work also on film. Arrabal is well known for his films Viva la muerte (1971) and I Will Walk Like a Crazy Horse (1973), while Jodorowsky achieved even more fame with Fando y Lis (1967), El Topo (1970) and The Holy Mountain (1973). Jodorowsky dissolved the Panic Movement in 1973, after the release of Arrabal's book Le panique.

See also 

 Christian Zeimert

References

Bibliography
 Arrabal, Fernando (1973). Le Panique. Paris: Union générale d'éditions (10/18).
 Arrabal, Fernando, Jodorowsky, Alejandro, Topor, Roland (1978). Panico. Italy: Pellicanolibri
 Arrabal, Fernando (2006). Panique  Manifeste pour le troisième millénaire. Paris: Ed. Punctum.
 Aranzueque-Arrieta, Frédéric (2008). Panique: Arrabal, Jodorowsky, Topor [essay]. L'Harmattan.

Alejandro Jodorowsky
Roland Topor
Surrealist groups
French surrealist artists
French artist groups and collectives